Shantideva (Sanskrit: Śāntideva; ; ;) was an 8th-century CE Indian philosopher, Buddhist monk, poet, and scholar at the mahavihara of Nalanda. He was an adherent of the Mādhyamaka philosophy of Nāgārjuna.

He is also considered to be one of the 84 mahasiddhas and is known as Bhusuku.

Biography

The Zhansi Lun of the East Asian Mādhyamaka identifies two different individuals given the name "Shant inideva": their founder of the Avaivartika Sangha in the 6th century CE and a later Shantideva who studied at Nalanda in the 8th century CE and appears to be the source of the Tibetan biographies. Archaeological discoveries support this thesis. Two Tibetan sources of the life of Shantideva are the historians Buton Rinchen Drub and Tāranātha. Recent scholarship has brought to light a short Sanskrit life of Shantideva in a 14th-century CE Nepalese manuscript. An accessible account that follows the Butön closely can be found in Kunzang Pelden, The Nectar of Manjushri's speech.

Shantideva was born in the Saurastra (in modern Gujarat), son of King Kalyanavarman, and he went by the name Śantivarman.

According to Pema Chödrön, "Shantideva was not well liked at Nalanda."

After being goaded into giving a talk to the entire university body, Shantideva delivered The Way of the Bodhisattva.

Works

Śikṣāsamuccaya
The Śikṣāsamuccaya ("Training Anthology") is a prose work in nineteen chapters. It is organized as a commentary on twenty-seven short mnemonic verses known as the Śikṣāsamuccaya Kārikā. It consists primarily of quotations (of varying length) from sūtras, authoritative texts considered to be the word of the Buddha — generally those sūtras associated with Mahāyāna tradition, including the Samadhiraja Sutra.

Bodhicaryavatara
Shantideva is particularly renowned as the author of the Bodhisattvacaryāvatāra. A variety of English translations exist, sometimes glossed as "A Guide to the Bodhisattva's Way of Life" or "Entering the Path of Enlightenment." It is a long poem describing the process of enlightenment from the first thought to full buddhahood and is still studied by Mahayana and Vajrayana Buddhists today.

An introduction to and commentary on the Bodhisattvacaryāvatāra by the 14th Dalai Lama called A Flash of Lightning in the Dark of Night was printed in 1994. A commentary on the Patience chapter was provided by the Dalai Lama in Healing Anger (1997), and his commentaries on the Wisdom chapter can be found in Practicing Wisdom (2004). Kunzang Palden has written a commentary based on that given by Patrul Rinpoche, translated by the Padmakara Translation Group. Patrul Rinpoche was a wandering monk of great scholarship, who dedicated his life to the propagation of the Bodhisattvacaryāvatāra.

Philosophical views

Personal identity and free will

Following the Buddha, Śāntideva understood that the self is an illusion. He also discusses the problem of free will in the Bodhicaryāvatāra, writing that "whatever transgressions (aparādha) and vile actions (pāpa) there are, all arise through the power of conditioning factors, while there is nothing that arises independently."

Ethical views

In line with his views on personal identity and the nature of the self, Śāntideva wrote that one ought to "stop all the present and future pain and suffering of all sentient beings, and to bring about all present and future pleasure and happiness", in what may have been "the very earliest clearly articulated statement of that view, preceding Jeremy Bentham by approximately a thousand years".

His basis for preferring altruism over egoism was that "the continuum of consciousness, like a queue, and the combination of constituents, like an army, are not real. The person who experiences suffering does not exist." Similarly, he asks, "when happiness is dear to me and others equally, what is so special about me that I strive after happiness only for myself?"

Footnotes

References

 Śāntideva, Cecil Bendall and W. H. D. Rouse (trans)(1922). Śikshā-samuccaya: a compendium of Buddhist doctrine, compiled by Śāntideva chiefly from earlier Mahāyāna Sūtras. London: Murray
 Of the progresse of the Bodhisattva: the bodhisattvamārga in the Śikṣāsamuccaya / Richard Mahoney (Oxford: Indica et Buddhica, 2016) , 978-0-473-40931-9 &c.
 L. D. Barnett (trans) (1909 ). "The Path of light rendered for the first time into Engl. from the Bodhicharyāvatāra of Śānti-Deva: a manual of Mahā-yāna Buddhism", New York, Dutton

External links

 Śāntideva's Bodhisattva-caryāvatāra English translation; Readable HTML.
 Internet Encyclopedia of Philosophy entry on Shantideva by Amod Lele
 Talk about Shantideva by Stephen Batchelor
 Engaging in Bodhisattva Behavior, full unpublished translation of the Bodhicaryavatara by Alexander Berzin
 Commentary to Bodhicaryavatara by Patrul Rinpoche (in English )
 Śikṣāsamuccaya of Śāntideva: Sanskrit Buddhist text
 
 

Bodhisattvas
8th-century Buddhists
Indian Buddhists
Indian scholars of Buddhism
Indian Buddhist monks
Mahasiddhas
Monks of Nalanda
Mahayana Buddhists
Madhyamaka scholars
Buddhist yogis
Scholars from Gujarat
7th-century births
8th-century deaths
Year of death unknown
8th-century Indian philosophers
8th-century Indian monks
Consequentialists